Butzer is a German surname. Notable people with the surname include:
Martin Bucer or Butzer (1491–1551), Protestant reformer
André Butzer (born 1973), German artist
Karl Butzer (1934–2016), American geographer

See also
Butz
Butser Ancient Farm
Butser Hill
Joseph Putzer (1836–1904), Austrian redemptorist
Karen Putzer (born 1978), Italian skier